The 2020 Utah Senate election was held on November 3, 2020 to elect state senators in 15 of the 29 Utah State Senate districts. These coincided with other elections in Utah, including for governor and the House of Representatives. State senators serve four-year terms in the Utah State Senate.

Results summary

District results

Retirements
Three incumbents did not seek re-election in 2020.

Republicans
District 7: Deidre Henderson retired to run for lieutenant governor.
District 19: Allen M. Christensen retired.
District 24: Ralph Okerlund retired.

Incumbents defeated

In primary elections

Republicans
One Republican lost renomination.
District 25: Lyle W. Hillyard lost renomination to Chris H. Wilson.

Open seats that parties held

Republican seats held by Republicans
Republicans held three of their open seats.
District 7: Won by Mike McKell.
District 19: Won by John D. Johnson.
District 24: Won by Derrin Owens.

Predictions

Close races

Results by district

District 1

District 6

District 7

District 8

District 10

District 13

District 14

District 16

District 19

District 20

District 23

District 24

District 25

District 27

District 29

References

Utah Senate
Senate
Utah State Senate elections